The 2021–22 West Indies Championship was the 55th edition of the Regional Four Day Competition, the domestic first-class cricket competition for the countries of the Cricket West Indies (CWI), which started on 9 February 2022. Six teams contested the tournament – Barbados, Guyana, Jamaica, the Leeward Islands, Trinidad and Tobago, and the Windward Islands. The series was played for the Headley–Weekes Trophy, named after George Headley and Sir Everton Weekes. Barbados were the defending champions.

The last domestic first-class matches played in the West Indies took place in March 2020, during the 2019–20 West Indies Championship. The final two rounds of that tournament were cancelled due to the COVID-19 pandemic. There was also no tournament in 2020–21 because of the pandemic. The first two rounds of fixtures took place in February 2022, followed by a break for the Test match series between the West Indies and England, with CWI announcing the fixtures for the final three rounds of matches in late March 2022.

On the last day of the fifth and final round of matches, Barbados won the tournament to retain their title.

Fixtures

Round 1

Round 2

Round 3

Round 4

Round 5

References

External links
 Series home at ESPN Cricinfo

2022 in West Indian cricket
Regional Four Day Competition seasons
West Indies Championship